Vasile Hossu (17 May 1919 – 18 June 1997) was a Romanian Greek Catholic hierarch. He was bishop of the Romanian Catholic Eparchy of Oradea Mare from 1990 to 1997.

Biography
Born in Nagykároly, Hungary (today Carei, Romania) in 1919, he was ordained a priest on 4 February 1945 by Bishop Ioan Suciu. He was arrested and detained several times by the Communist regime in Romania during the persecution and abolition of the Greek-Catholics.

He was appointed the Bishop by the Holy See on 14 March 1990. He was consecrated to the Episcopate on 27 May 1990. The principal consecrator was Archbishop Alexandru Todea and co-consecrators were Archbishop Guido Del Mestri and Bishop Ioan Ploscaru.

He died in Oradea on 18 June 1997.

See also

Catholic Church in Romania

References 

1919 births
1997 deaths
People from Carei
20th-century Eastern Catholic bishops
Romanian Greek-Catholic bishops
Romanian anti-communist clergy
Romanian prisoners and detainees
People detained by the Securitate